Ignacio (formerly Pacheco) is an unincorporated community in Marin County, California.

Ignacio is a neighborhood located west of Bel Marin Keys, CA.

History
Two authenticated Coast Miwok villages existed near Ignacio: Puyuku (south of the town) and Shotokmo-cha (to the southeast).

During the 1840s and 1850s, Ignacio was part of Rancho San Jose, a  land grant which Governor Alvarado awarded to Ignacio Pacheco.  After Ignacio died in 1864, his estate was divided among his heirs.

During World War II, Ignacio became the site of military housing for Hamilton Air Force Base. These military houses were eventually torn down and replaced by a more suburban community.

The Ignacio post office opened in 1893, closed in 1944, and re-opened in 1961.

See also
 Northwestern Pacific Railroad

References

Unincorporated communities in California
Unincorporated communities in Marin County, California